Bill Pearson may refer to:
 Billy Pearson (1920–2002), American jockey
 Billy Pearson (footballer) (1921–2009), Irish footballer
 Bill Pearson (New Zealand writer) (1922–2002), New Zealand fiction writer, essayist and critic
 Bill Pearson (footballer, born 1922) (1922–2010), Australian rules footballer for Essendon
 Bill Pearson (footballer, born 1892) (1892–1959), Australian rules footballer for South Melbourne
 Bill Pearson (American writer) (born 1938), American novelist, publisher and editor
 Bill Pearson (rugby league), Australian rugby league footballer and coach
 Bill Pearson (Neighbours), fictional character on the Australian soap opera Neighbours

See also
 William Pearson (disambiguation)